Georgia State Route 50 Spur may refer to:

 Georgia State Route 50 Spur (Albany): a former spur route that existed in Albany
 Georgia State Route 50 Spur (Shellman): a former spur route that existed in Shellman

050 Spur